Jeffrey S. Feinstein (born January 29, 1945) is a retired career officer of the United States Air Force (USAF). During the Vietnam War, Feinstein was a weapon systems officer, an integral part of two-man aircrews with the emergence of air-to-air missiles as the primary weapons during aerial combat. Flying aboard F-4 Phantom IIs, Feinstein downed five enemy aircraft, thereby becoming a flying ace, the last of five U.S. aviators to become aces during that conflict and to date still the most recent aviator to achieve ace status in the U.S. military.

Early life
Born in Chicago, Illinois, on January 29, 1945, Feinstein enlisted in the USAF in 1963 to attend the United States Military Academy Preparatory School.  He subsequently entered the United States Air Force Academy in 1964 and graduated in 1968.

Military career
Feinstein was rejected from pilot training due to  excessive myopia. He then underwent Undergraduate Navigator Training and he graduated.

While assigned to the 80th Tactical Fighter Squadron, he was detached to the 13th Tactical Fighter Squadron, part of the 432d Tactical Reconnaissance Wing, based at Udorn Royal Thai Air Force Base, Thailand.
His actions, for which he received multiple awards of the Distinguished Flying Cross and Silver Star for his first four kills and the Air Force Cross for his fifth kill, took place prior to and during Operation Linebacker in 1972, making him a flying ace.

His nickname/tactical callsign was "Fang." Having originally been designated as an Air Force Navigator, he was given a vision waiver after Vietnam (Feinstein wore glasses to correct mild nearsightedness to 20/20).

Reassigned to the 9th Air Force staff at Shaw AFB, South Carolina in the 1990s, Feinstein also flew as Airborne Command Element Director aboard E-3 Sentry AWACS aircraft during Operations Desert Shield and Desert Storm from August 1990 to February 1991.

Lieutenant Colonel Feinstein retired from the U.S. Air Force on 1 July 1996.

Awards and decorations
In addition to his Command Pilot wings, Navigator wings, and Parachutist wings, Feinstein was awarded the Air Force Cross, Silver Star (4 awards), Legion of Merit, Distinguished Flying Cross with Combat "V" (5 awards), Bronze Star Medal, Purple Heart, Meritorious Service Medal, Air Medal (23 awards), Aerial Achievement Medal, Air Force Commendation Medal, and numerous unit, expeditionary and service awards.

Air Force Cross citation

Feinstein, Jeffrey S.,
Captain, U.S Air Force
13th Tactical Fighter Squadron, 388th Tactical Fighter Wing,  Korat Royal Thai Air Base, Thailand 
Date of Action:  October 13, 1972

Citation:

MiG kill summary

References

External links
US Air-to-Air Victories 
Airman: Vietnam War Aces

American Vietnam War flying aces
United States Air Force officers
United States Air Force Academy alumni
Recipients of the Distinguished Flying Cross (United States)
Recipients of the Silver Star
Recipients of the Air Force Cross (United States)
Living people
Recipients of the Air Medal
Recipients of the Legion of Merit
Recipients of the Meritorious Service Medal (United States)
United States Air Force personnel of the Vietnam War
1945 births
Military personnel from Chicago
Aviators from Illinois
United States Air Force personnel of the Gulf War